Plum Brandy, a painting by Impressionist painter Édouard Manet
 Plum Brandy Blues, a 1997 album by the Romanian band Nightlosers
 Slivovitz, a European plum spirit